Progressive Baptists are members of the Progressive National Baptist Convention or any number of Baptist groups that are progressive in their methods. Groups such as the Alliance of Baptists, Cooperative Baptist Fellowship, and many others frequently use progressive as a self-descriptive term. They emphasize their interest in moderate to liberal theology, as well as new ideas, methods, and opportunities.

See also
 Alliance of Baptists
 Association of Welcoming and Affirming Baptists
 Baptist Peace Fellowship of North America
 Cooperative Baptist Fellowship
 American Baptist Churches USA
 Progressive National Baptist Convention

Baptist denominations
Liberalism and religion